Ghassan Nehme is a former Lebanese professional basketball player for Atlas Club in the Lebanese Basketball League.

References

 eurobasket.com

External links
Fairleigh Dickinson Knights bio

Living people
1995 births
Fairleigh Dickinson Knights men's basketball players
Lebanese men's basketball players
Point guards
St. Benedict's Preparatory School alumni
Shooting guards
Sagesse SC basketball players